The Gesta Treverorum (Deeds of the Trevians) is a collection of histories, legends, wars, records of the Archbishops of Trier (Trèves), writings of the Popes, and other records that were collected by the monks of the St. Matthias' Abbey in Trier. It was begun in the 12th century and was continued until 1794 when the Archbishopric of Trier came to an end. An edition was published as an eight-volume set in the 19th century. A new 8-volume edition by Emil Zenz was published in the 1950s and 1960s.

Edition
Zenz, Emil (ed. and tr.) (1955–1962). Die Taten der Trierer. Gesta Treverorum. 8 vols. Trier. Edition with German translation.
Waitz, Georg (ed.) (1848). "Gesta Treverorum." MGH Scriptores 8. pp. 111–200.
Waitz, Georg (ed.) (1879). "Gesta Treverorum continuata." MGH Scriptores 24. pp. 368–488.

Further reading
Hellmann, S. (1913). "Zu den Gesta Treverorum." Neues Archiv der Gesellschaft für ältere deutsche Geschichtskunde. Zur Beforderung einer Gesamtausgabe der Quellenschriften deutscher Geschichten des Mittelalters 38. pp. 451–468.
Laufner, Richard (2001). "Zwei restaurierte Handschriften der Stadtbibliothek Trier. Gesta Treverorum und Chartularium von St. Mariae ad Martyres." Kurtrierisches Jahrbuch 41 (2001). pp. 315–32.
Thomas, Heinz (1968). Studien zur Trierer Geschichtsschreibung des 11. Jahrhunderts: insbesondere zu den Gesta Treverorum. Rheinisches Archiv 68. Bonn.

External links
Digital MGH.

Medieval literature
History of Trier